Drążdżewo Nowe  is a village in the administrative district of Gmina Jednorożec, within Przasnysz County, Masovian Voivodeship, in east-central Poland.

History
Drążdżewo Nowe (New Drążdżewo or New Brushwood) was a privately owned settlement already existing in 1386. However, the site already had previously contained a number of small villages, but only Drążdżewo Nowe (New Drążdżewo) now survives.

The word drążdżewo is derived from the word drzążdż (Proto-Slavonic dręzga), meaning brushwood. The settlement, at times, has also been known as Draszewo and, later, also as Drasdzew, Drzanzewo, and Drzązewo.

A post-World War I census, taken in 1921, recorded 25 homes and 145 inhabitants living in the village.

The village is incorporated under the municipality of Gmina Jednorożec, which was established in 1867.

See also
Gmina Jednorożec
Jednorożec

References

Villages in Przasnysz County